Trichopeltum is a genus of fungi in the Microthyriaceae family; according to the 2007 Outline of Ascomycota, the placement in this family is uncertain.

Species
As accepted by Species Fungorum;
 Trichopeltum africanum 
 Trichopeltum carissae 
 Trichopeltum hawaiiense 
 Trichopeltum kentaniense

References

External links
Index Fungorum

Microthyriales